There are two species of lizard named lined flying dragon:
 Draco lineatus, found in Indonesia, the Philippines, and Malaysia
 Draco modiglianii, found in Indonesia